Lakeland High School (LHS), commonly referred to as White Lake Lakeland or Lakeland, is a public high school located in White Lake, Michigan. , the current Interim principal is Dr. Brigitte Knudson. Lakeland opened in 1975, and is in the Huron Valley School District.

While the physical school itself opened in September of 1975 (for the 1975-1976 school year), a separate class of "Lakeland High School" students attended Milford High School for one year (1974-1975), on a split schedule.

Athletics

Lakeland High School is a member of the Michigan High School Athletic Association (MHSAA) and is home to 14 boys and 14 girls varsity teams across 18 different sports. Lakeland has won five state titles since opening in 1975. These include four in boys' cross country (1991, 1996, 1997, 2016), and one in girls' bowling (2006).

Notable alumni

Steve Hamilton - author
Chris Haslock - Olympic aerial skier
 T.J. Lang - NFL player

Notes

References

External links

Huron Valley School District

Public high schools in Michigan
Educational institutions established in 1976
High schools in Oakland County, Michigan
1976 establishments in Michigan